Extortion is an Australian hardcore punk band from Perth, Western Australia. Formed in 2005, they are active in the Australian hardcore scene. They are heavily influenced by powerviolence bands such as Siege, Negative FX, No Comment and Infest however the band considers themselves a Hardcore band with a Powerviolence influence.

Discography
Demo
Extortion (2005, Eerie Stratum)
Demo (2010, Coffin Cut Records)

EPs
Control (2007, Deep Six Records)
Terminal Cancer (2009, Way Back When Records, Shortfuse Records)

Studio albums
Degenerate (2006, Common Bond Records, Deep Six Records)
Sick (2007, Common Bond Records, Deep Six Records)
Loose Screws (2010, Deep Six Records, Resist Records)

Other releases
Extortion / Agents Of Abhorrence (2008)
Do The Bonobo Bop!(Rupture) / Extortion (2008)
Extortion / Jed Whitey (2009)
Extortion / Septic Surge (2009)
Extortion / I.S. For Household (2010)
Extortion / Cold World (2012)
Get Fucked 5" (2011)

Band members
Current members
 Rohan Harrison – lead vocals
 Jay Kinkade – guitars
 Milky – drums
 Louis Dunstan – bass

Past members
 Rhys Davies – drums
 Brendan – bass

References

External links
Official Facebook
Bandcamp
Blogspot

Musical groups established in 2005
Musical quartets
Australian hardcore punk groups
Powerviolence groups